Pannaga Bharana is an Indian film director and actor who works in Kannada cinema. He is the son of famous director T. S. Nagabharana. He rose to fame with 2017 film Happy New Year.

Career
Pannaga Bharana started his career way back working as a child artist in the films his father directed. Later on, he decided to do something creative other than acting and being inspired by his father, he concentrated on filmmaking solely. But sometime in between, one of his friends who is a casting director called him to fill the place of an actor in an ad and he got recognition. Then his friend Prajwal Devaraj gave him the opportunity to act with him in the movie Mrugashira and for that, he bagged the award of Best Actor in Supporting Role at SIIMA awards.

When Pannaga was young he wanted to be a cricketer but with time he started to develop a likeness for the stage and started off as a dancer. He was a regular performer at all cultural fests and won many prizes as a dancer. He was a student of Jain University and during that time he started working as an editor in their own editing studio and earned salary for his pocket money. During that time he developed a strong affinity towards film direction and realized that he should try his hands at that. He went to the sets with his father T. S. Nagabharana and tried to learn and also assisted with his films. Next, on his father's advice, he went to study filmmaking at New York Film Academy and had done his masters for 2 years. He came back to the country and thought of directing and making his own films. He also began to run a film school which was originally his father's dream. After Pannaga completed his study abroad he worked there for a year and then came back to Mumbai and worked for 6 months before finally settling in Bangalore to fulfill his dream of directing movies. During this time he went around convincing producers to fund his projects. After facing a lot of rejections, he decided to produce his own directed movie, luckily he got the producer for his directorial venture and finally, his hard work paid off. Pannaga Bharana, despite facing a lot of challenges in his career was finally able to overcome the hurdles and present himself as a successful director in the Kannada film industry. Mainly inspired by his talented father he started to follow his footsteps in the art of filmmaking and nurturing his love for it.

Personal life
Pannaga Bharana was born on 12 December to the famous Kannada film director T. S. Nagabharana and Nagini Bharana. His mother Nagini Bharana is a producer, costume designer. Pannaga married his longtime girlfriend Nikitha in 2014 and have a son.They named him Ved Bharana.

Filmography

As an actor

As a director

As a producer

Awards

References

External links
 

Living people
Kannada film directors
Film directors from Bangalore
Male actors in Kannada cinema
Year of birth missing (living people)